The white-browed bush chat (Saxicola macrorhynchus), also known as Stoliczka's bushchat, is an Old World flycatcher in the genus Saxicola.  The alternative name is after the discoverer, geologist and explorer Ferdinand Stoliczka.

This desert specialist has a small, declining population because of agricultural intensification and encroachment, which qualifies it as vulnerable.

The white-browed bush chat is found in an area of semi-arid country in north-western India and eastern Pakistan. It has apparently strayed as far east as the Bharatpur area of Rajasthan and as far south as Goa and Pune, with two simultaneous historical records from southern Afghanistan.

Gallery

Notes

References

Other sources
BirdLife Species Factsheet.
Red-Data Book Species Information
Endangered and Threatened Birds of the World, a photo discussion by Don Roberson
Urquhart, E. & Bowley, A. 2002. Stonechats. A Guide to the Genus Saxicola. Helm. 

white-browed bush chat
Birds of Afghanistan
Birds of India
Birds of Pakistan
white-browed bush chat